Lucile Lloyd, also known as Lucile Lloyd Brown, Lucila Lloyd Nulty (August 28, 1894 – February 25, 1941) was an American muralist, illustrator, and decorative painter. In 1937, Lloyd worked with the Works Progress Administration's Federal Arts Project to paint three murals in the assembly room in the state building in Los Angeles, California.

Early life
Lloyd was born in Cincinnati, Ohio. Her parents were Mary Alice (Holcomb) and Harry Kensington Lloyd. She apprenticed in her father's stained-glass and textile design studio. Her English grandfather was a textile designer during the Arts and Crafts movement.

She attended school at the Woman's Art School at Cooper Union in New York City and won two scholarships to the Art Students League of New York. While at Cooper Union she studied with Frank Fairbanks, Frederick Dielman, Robert Tyland, and Joseph C. Chase. She was the first woman to work in the drafting room of architect Bertram G. Goodhue and painted her first mural decoration at the age of twenty.

In 1919 Lloyd married Addison Brown II, son of Addison Brown. They had one child, Addison Brown III.

Career
Lloyd moved with her husband and son to California in 1919. She opened a studio, taught classes and took the role of directorship of the Stickney Memorial Art School in Pasadena. Lloyd worked as a muralist and decorator and also produced bookplates, cartoons, logos, water color, charcoal, architectural renderings and stained-glass designs. She worked with many well-known architectural firms including Howard Hewitt, Marsh, Smith, and Powell, Carleton Monroe Wilson, and the West Coast office of Bertam Goodhue.

In 1923, Lloyd contributed an article in the December issue of California Southland (pg. 14) entitled, The Relationship Between Architecture and Decoration, in which she acknowledges that while the architect has the vision, it is the interior specialist that brings together the decorative elements that complete a space. Lloyd mentions the need for time to research and create full scale working drawings as well as full color renderings. She goes on to stress that muralists such as herself be included from the onset of a project. "Bringing in an artist at the last minute can lead to a displeased client". "If the client could only be persuaded to put the money he spends, later, on landscapes or genre paintings which do not go with his house, into one good ceiling for over-mantel, which becomes a part of the architecture of his home, he would be better satisfied in the end." She closes her article by saying that while mural artists "speak the language of trade painters, murals artist are not to be confused with 'house painters'".

In 1925, her spouse Addison Brown II divorced her and moved with their two-year-old child back to the East Coast.

The Madonna of the Covered Wagon (1928) was a large mural completed at a middle school in south Pasadena. The scene recalls a journey made by thousands of pioneer families as they cam west during the 1800s. While the work was considered by some critics of the time as saccharine, it is typical of the Illustrators School which was the style of her time. Los Angeles Times art critic Arthur Millier gave the work high praise saying, "her delightful mural combines humor and sentiment in delightful proportions.

Lloyd was one of six artists who submitted drawings for the murals at Griffith Observatory. She was a member of the California Art Club, Women Painters of the West, American Bookplate Society and the California State Historical Association.

She married her second husband Niel McNulty in 1936, who died in 1939.

Lucile Lloyd committed suicide in February 1941, "overcome by gas".

Commissioned artwork

Publications 
A list of articles and essays penned by Lucile Lloyd about her mural work.

References

 "California's Name" - Three WPA sponsored Murals by Lucile Lloyd - published by California State Senate Rules Committee - January, 1992

External links
Lucile Lloyd papers, 1916-1941 from the Archives of American Art, Smithsonian Institution
A Life In Murals Lucile Lloyd · Lucile Lloyd: A Life in Murals · UCSB ADC Omeka
Picturing California's History Picturing California's History · Lucile Lloyd: A Life in Murals · UCSB ADC Omeka

American muralists
American women painters
1894 births
1941 deaths
Painters from California
Artists from Los Angeles
Artists from Cincinnati
Art Students League of New York alumni
Bertram Goodhue buildings
Federal Art Project artists
20th-century American painters
20th-century American women artists
Women muralists
1941 suicides
Suicides by gas